Arend "Arie" Haan (born 16 November 1948) is a Dutch football manager and former player who played as a midfielder. He scored 6 goals in 35 matches for the Netherlands national team of the 1970s. At club level, he enjoyed a successful career with AFC Ajax, R.S.C. Anderlecht, Standard Liège and PSV Eindhoven.

He participated in seven finals of European club competitions with five victories and two defeats. He was also known for his goals from long distance. At international level, he played 35 times for the Netherlands national team and was on the losing side for them in two World Cup finals.

After retiring as a player, he managed numerous club sides in Europe and China, as well as the national teams of China, Cameroon and Albania.

Playing career 
Haan joined AFC Ajax in 1969 and was a member of Ajax that won the European Cup for three consecutive years, from 1971 until 1973, the Intercontinental Cup in 1972 and two European Super Cups, in 1972 and 1973. Also with Ajax, he won three Eredivisie titles in 1969–70, 1971–72 and 1972–73 and the Dutch Cup from 1970 until 1972. In 1970, his team won the Double and in 1972, the Treble.

He joined Belgian club R.S.C. Anderlecht in 1975 and was a member of the club's greatest ever successful period, when they won two European Cup Winners' Cups in 1976 and 1978. Those two seasons, he won two more European Super Cups (the previous two were with Ajax). The club again reached the final of that Cup Winners' Cup in 1977 too, but they were beaten by Hamburger SV. Also with Anderlecht he won the Belgian Cup in 1975–76 and the Belgian Championship in 1980–81.

After winning the championship with Anderlecht, he played for Standard Liège for two seasons, when the club won two championships. also the Belgian Supercup in 1981.
In 1982, the club achieved its greatest success, when they reached their first (and to date the only) Cup Winners' Cup final, when they were beaten at Camp Nou by FC Barcelona. That year they also won the only double in their history. Returning to his country in 1983, he played one season for PSV. Haan finished his career for Hong Kong champions Seiko SA.

He has 35 matches with his national team, scoring 6 goals. His most famous was a 40-yard strike in the Netherlands' match against Italy in the second group stage of the 1978 FIFA World Cup. His goal in the 2–2 game against West Germany, also a strike from far out in the field, helped the Netherlands national team reach the final, where they were beaten by Argentina 3–1 in extra time. He also participated in the 1974 FIFA World Cup when the Netherlands were beaten in the final by West Germany 2–1.

Managerial career 

Two months after retiring as a player, he became trainer of Antwerp. However, in the middle of the 1985–86 season he became coach of Anderlecht Brussels, replacing Paul Van Himst who was fired from the club. Franky Vercauteren and Morten Olsen featured in his team alongside players like goalkeeper Jacky Munaron, Luka Peruzović, Erwin Vandenbergh, Alex Czerniatynski, Enzo Scifo and Georges Grün. In 1986, Anderlecht won the championship, after a two-legged play-off against Club Brugge. Club Brugge forced a 1–1 draw away to Anderlecht, and led 2–0 at home after thirty minutes, but Anderlecht managed to equalise. The same season, the club reached the semi finals of the European Champions' Cup, by eliminating Bayern Munich. The following season, his team retained the Belgian Championship.

After Belgium he became trainer of VfB Stuttgart in Germany on 1 July 1987. Stuttgart reached their first European cup final in 1989, the UEFA Cup, but failed to win the trophy against SSC Napoli (1–2, 3–3), a team that Diego Maradona was playing for at the time. He remained in Stuttgart until 26 March 1990. In July 1990 he became manager of 1. FC Nürnberg where he remained for a single season.

Returning to Belgium in 1991, he coached Standard Liège until the middle of the season 1993–94 and won the Belgian Cup in 1993. In the 1994–95 season he was appointed coach of PAOK FC and he remained there until October 1995, after which he returned to the Netherlands and managed Feyenoord for two seasons. In his first season Feyenoord finished 2nd in the Eredivisie.

After ten years, in December 1997, Haan enjoyed a further stint at Anderlecht, spending nine months at the club before returning to PAOK, where he remained as coach until December 1999. He went to Cyprus, to become AC Omonia manager in November 2000 but he coached the team only for two matches since he had a great offer from Austria Vienna to become the team's manager. He asked from his club to release his contract and that was accepted. He left from Austria in August 2001.

He coached the Chinese national football team for two years since December 2002. In 2004, China hosted the Asia Cup and reached the final where his team was beaten by Japan. However, his team did not qualify for the 2006 FIFA World Cup after their elimination from the First round of qualifications, where China lost the first position the group to Kuwait. He remained as coach of China until November 2004.

Moving to Persepolis F.C. in February 2006, he helped his team reach the Hazfi Cup final. He was fired by the club just before the 2006–07 season began as he had problems with club management. Recently, he became trainer of Cameroon national team, however he resigned less than six months into a two-year contract citing interference from the president of Cameroon Football Federation Mohammed Iya as the reason.

In December 2007, Albanian Football Federation president Armando Duka announced Haan would replace Croatia's Otto Baric as Albania head coach. He signed a two-year contract on 4 January 2008 and cancelled his contract on 15 April 2009.
On 29 May 2009 it was confirmed that Haan will succeed Wei Xin as the new manager of struggling Chinese Super League side Chongqing Lifan and took over in June that year. In August 2009, Haan was suspended for three Super League matches after waving money at a referee. Chongqing Lifan were relegated at the end of the 2009 league season and Haan left for fellow Chinese Super League team Tianjin Teda F.C. He brought the team to the second place in 2010 season, the club's highest rank ever achieved in the China Super League, which earned the team a place in the AFC Champions League in 2011. In the 2011 season of CSL, though the team only ranked 10th. at last, Haan led the team won the championship of China's FA Cup, with the score of 2–1 against Shandong Luneng Taishan F.C. This championship is the first title Tianjin Teda achieved since its establishment in 1998.

Statistics with the Albania team

Honours

Player
Ajax
 Eredivisie: 1969–70, 1971–72, 1972–73
 KNVB Cup: 1969–70, 1970–71, 1971–72
 European Cup: 1970–71, 1971–72, 1972–73
 Intercontinental Cup: 1972
 European Super Cup: 1972, 1973

Anderlecht
 Belgian First Division: 1980–81
 Belgian Cup: 1975–76
European Cup Winners' Cup: 1975–76, 1977–78; runner-up 1976–77
European Super Cup: 1976, 1978
Amsterdam Tournament: 1976
Tournoi de Paris: 1977
Jules Pappaert Cup: 1977
Belgian Sports Merit Award: 1978

Standard Liège
 Belgian First Division: 1981–82, 1982–83
European Cup Winners' Cup: runner-up 1981–82

PSV
 Eredivisie: runner-up 1983–84

Seiko
 Hong Kong First Division League: 1984–85
 Hong Kong Viceroy Cup: 1984–85

Netherlands
FIFA World Cup: runner-up 1974, 1978
UEFA European Football Championship: third place 1976

Manager
Anderlecht
 Belgian First Division: 1985–86

VfB Stuttgart
 UEFA Cup: runner-up 1988–89

Standard Liège
 Belgian Cup: 1992–93

Tianjin Teda
 Chinese FA Cup: 2011

References

External links

 CV Arie Haan 

1948 births
Living people
Association football midfielders
Dutch footballers
Dutch expatriate footballers
Dutch football managers
Dutch expatriate football managers
AFC Ajax players
R.S.C. Anderlecht players
Standard Liège players
PSV Eindhoven players
Eredivisie players
Belgian Pro League players
Netherlands international footballers
1974 FIFA World Cup players
1978 FIFA World Cup players
UEFA Euro 1980 players
2004 AFC Asian Cup managers
Royal Antwerp F.C. managers
R.S.C. Anderlecht managers
VfB Stuttgart managers
1. FC Nürnberg managers
Standard Liège managers
PAOK FC managers
Feyenoord managers
AC Omonia managers
FK Austria Wien managers
Chongqing Liangjiang Athletic F.C. managers
China national football team managers
Persepolis F.C. managers
Cameroon national football team managers
Albania national football team managers
Dutch expatriate sportspeople in Belgium
Expatriate footballers in Belgium
Dutch expatriate sportspeople in Germany
Dutch expatriate sportspeople in Greece
Dutch expatriate sportspeople in Cyprus
Dutch expatriate sportspeople in Austria
Dutch expatriate sportspeople in China
Dutch expatriate sportspeople in Iran
Dutch expatriate sportspeople in Cameroon
Dutch expatriate sportspeople in Albania
Dutch expatriate sportspeople in Hong Kong
Expatriate football managers in Greece
Expatriate football managers in Cyprus
Expatriate football managers in Iran
People from Oldambt (municipality)
Hong Kong First Division League players
Seiko SA players
Expatriate footballers in Hong Kong
Bundesliga managers
Expatriate football managers in Austria
Expatriate football managers in Germany
Tianjin Jinmen Tiger F.C. managers
Expatriate football managers in China
Expatriate football managers in Albania
Expatriate football managers in Cameroon
UEFA Champions League winning players
Persian Gulf Pro League managers
Footballers from Groningen (province)
Expatriate football managers in West Germany
Dutch expatriate sportspeople in West Germany